Lake Michigan–Huron (also Huron–Michigan) is the body of water combining both Lake Michigan and Lake Huron, which are joined through the , , open-water Straits of Mackinac. Huron and Michigan are hydrologically a single lake because the flow of water through the straits keeps their water levels in overall equilibrium. Although the flow is generally eastward, the water moves in either direction depending on local conditions. Combined, Lake Michigan–Huron is the largest freshwater lake by area in the world. Lake Superior is larger than either individually, so it is counted as the largest of the Great Lakes when Lake Michigan and Lake Huron are considered separately.

Geologic history
During the last ice age, the sizes and connectivity of the two lake basins varied dramatically over time. Sequential advances and retreats of the Laurentian ice sheet repeatedly opened and dammed various possible outlets from the area, as well as providing dramatically varying amounts of meltwater to the system. Numerous proglacial lakes formed in various places and configurations as the ice sheet advanced and retreated. At various times, what is now Michigan–Huron was clearly separated into two or more lakes, and at other times was part of a single, deeper lake.

Around 9,000 years BC, as the ice sheet retreated, the modern Lakes Huron, Michigan, and much of Superior, were a single lake known to geologists as Lake Algonquin. Ice sheets dammed Lake Algonquin to the northeast. Before that, Lake Chicago occupied the southern tip of the Lake Michigan basin, at the southern end of the ice sheet. Lake Algonquin and Lake Chicago both drained south into the Mississippi River watershed. Around 9,500 years ago, new pathways draining the system to the east were opened by the retreat of the ice, and proglacial Lake Stanley (precursor of Lake Huron) was separated from proglacial Lake Chippewa (precursor of Lake Michigan), with Lake Chippewa at a slightly higher level. They were connected by the now-submerged Mackinac Channel, which discharged into Lake Stanley over Mackinac Falls. Ongoing warping of the land by post-glacial rebound due to the retreat of the glacial ice continued to modify the drainage structure of the region, allowing the reunification of all three basins (Superior, Michigan, and Huron) as the Nipissing Great Lakes. This arrangement was probably stable for more than 1,000 years, ending only when lake outlets other than the St. Clair River were cut off around 4,000 years ago. The current configuration of the lakes reflects the latest step in a long history of their post-glacial evolution.

Bathymetry and hydrology 

Although the Straits create a pronounced bottleneck in the contours of the shoreline and a major constriction in the local bathymetry, defining two distinct basins, they are still deep and wide enough to allow the free exchange of water between the two sides. Because of the link through the Straits, Lakes Michigan and Huron have the same mean water level (in June 2015 it was ).

The largest inflow to the system is the St. Mary's River from Lake Superior, and the main outflow is the St. Clair River toward Lake Erie; both lie in the Lake Huron basin. The combined effects of seiches (resonant standing waves) and of differing weather conditions (atmospheric pressure, wind) over each basin act to drive water either way through the Straits on a variety of characteristic timescales, at amounts sometimes exceeding  for several hours in either direction. Flows into the system from Lake Superior are controlled  by the bi-national Lake Superior Board of Control through the operation of locks and canals.

Constituent lakes 
Because of the relatively small depth and width of the Straits of Mackinac compared to the water bodies it connects, the distinct basins that these occupy, and historical naming convention, Lake Michigan and Lake Huron are usually considered distinct. For instance, these two lakes are typically recorded as separate entries in lists of the largest lakes in the world by area and volume. In the context of hydrology, however, the two are considered one body of water. Because of the hydrologic connectivity through the Straits, some sources have considered the total area and volume of Lake Michigan–Huron when placing this system in a global or regional context.

When Lake Michigan–Huron is treated as a single entity, it is the largest freshwater lake by surface area in the world.

See also
List of lakes by area
List of lakes by volume
Michilimackinac

References
Notes

Further reading

External links
Lake Iroquois
Drifting Buoys Track Water Currents in the Great Lakes Straits of Mackinac
Great Lakes water level observations

Great Lakes
Michigan-Huron
Michigan-Huron
Lakes of Wisconsin
Lakes of Michigan
Lakes of Ontario
Lakes of Illinois
Lakes of Indiana
International lakes of North America